Tavares Montgomery Williams (born October 8, 1971) is an American professional basketball coach and a former player and executive who is the head coach for the Phoenix Suns of the National Basketball Association (NBA). Williams played for five NBA teams during a playing career that spanned from 1994 to 2003. His NBA coaching career has included stints as an assistant coach, associate head coach, and head coach. 

Williams was the head coach for the New Orleans Hornets/Pelicans from  until . He served as an assistant coach with the United States national team under Mike Krzyzewski, and he has worked as a vice president of basketball operations for the San Antonio Spurs. In May 2019, Williams was hired as the head coach of the Phoenix Suns. In 2021, he led the Suns to their first NBA Finals appearance since 1993. He was named the NBA Coach of the Year the following year in 2022, when the Suns finished the regular season with a franchise record of 64 wins.

Playing career
As a  small forward from the University of Notre Dame, Williams was an honorable mention All-American, averaging 22.4 points and 8.4 rebounds during his senior season. Williams was an NBA first-round pick despite a pre-existing heart condition that kept him out for two seasons at Notre Dame. He was selected by the New York Knicks in the first round (24th overall) of the 1994 NBA draft.

Williams played in nine NBA seasons from 1994 to 2003. He played for the Knicks until 1996, when he was traded alongside Charles Smith to the San Antonio Spurs for Brad Lohaus, J.R. Reid and a future first round pick that became John Wallace. In 1999, he signed with the Denver Nuggets but was released within a month. The Orlando Magic claimed Williams off waivers and he stayed with the team until 2002, when he joined the Philadelphia 76ers in free agency. In 2003, Williams was re-acquired by the Orlando Magic in a trade sending a conditional pick swap to Orlando. He was waived by the Magic three days later, effectively ending his basketball career. In his NBA career, Williams played in 456 games, scored a total of 2,884 points and averaged 6.3 points per game. Chronic knee problems forced him into retirement in 2003.

Coaching career
In spring 2005, Williams won an NBA championship as a coaching staff intern with the San Antonio Spurs. In fall 2005, Williams was hired by new head coach Nate McMillan as an assistant coach for the Portland Trail Blazers.

On June 29, 2015, Williams became the associate head coach of the Oklahoma City Thunder. On June 1, 2016, it was announced that Williams would not return with the Thunder.

On June 4, 2018, Brett Brown announced that Williams would join his staff in Philadelphia as the lead assistant coach, his first coaching job in two seasons.

New Orleans Hornets/Pelicans

On June 7, 2010, Williams was offered a three-year contract to be the head coach of the New Orleans Hornets. At the date of hiring, Williams became the youngest head coach in the NBA at 38 years old. In his first season with the Hornets, the team finished with a 46–36 record and made the playoffs. On August 18, 2012, Williams accepted a four-year contract extension from the Hornets (later renamed as the Pelicans). On June 9, 2013, Williams accepted an assistant coach role with the U.S. national team, along with Jim Boeheim and Tom Thibodeau, for the 2016 Summer Olympics in Rio de Janeiro, Brazil. The New Orleans Pelicans finished the 2014–15 season with a 45–37 record before losing to the Golden State Warriors in the first round of the playoffs. On May 12, 2015, Williams was let go after five seasons as head coach of the Pelicans, compiling a 173–221 regular season record and going 2–8 in the playoffs.

Phoenix Suns
In May 2019, the Phoenix Suns announced they had signed Williams as the team's head coach on a five-year deal. The Suns compiled a 26–39 record in his first season coaching them before the season was postponed due to the COVID-19 pandemic. The Suns were later invited to the 2020 NBA Bubble in order to play eight seeding games, where Williams coached the Suns to an 8–0 record, improving their overall record that season to 34–39. Despite this, the Suns failed to qualify for the play-in tournament to enter the 2020 NBA playoffs.

On November 16, 2020, Williams reunited with star point guard Chris Paul after last coaching him back in 2011 when they were with the New Orleans Hornets. After the conclusion of the 2020–21 season Williams was named NBCA Coach of the Year. He also finished second in the NBA Coach of the Year voting behind Tom Thibodeau. The Suns finished the season with a 51–21 record, clinching the division and the second seed in the Western Conference. Williams coached the Suns to a first round series victory over the defending champion Los Angeles Lakers in six games, and a sweep of the Denver Nuggets in the conference semifinals. Williams then coached the Suns to a Western Conference Finals victory over the Los Angeles Clippers in six games, advancing the Suns to the NBA Finals for the first time since 1993. This is also the first Finals appearance for Williams in his coaching career. Facing the Milwaukee Bucks, the Suns would lose in six games.

On December 27, 2021, Williams was placed in the Suns COVID-19 protocol. On January 30, 2022, Williams was named as the Western Conference head coach for the 2022 NBA All-Star Game as a result of his team's NBA-best record at a league-best 40–9 record this season. Williams and the Suns were the 1st team to clinch a playoff birth on the season with a 53-13 record.  The Suns finished the season with franchise record for wins, compiling 64 wins to 18 losses.  Williams was selected for his second consecutive NBCA Coach of the Year award. On March 9, 2022 , Williams was named the 2022 NBA Coach of the Year leading the Suns to a franchise record in wins at 64–18 and the best record in the league after finishing 2nd the year prior in the voting.

Executive career
In 2016, Williams became the vice president of basketball operations for the San Antonio Spurs. On June 26, 2017, while serving as vice president for the Spurs, Williams was selected as the winner of the Sager Strong Award during the first NBA Awards show.

Personal life
On February 10, 2016, Williams' wife, Ingrid, died from injuries sustained from a car crash in Oklahoma City after her car was struck head-on by a vehicle that crossed lanes after losing control. The couple had five children together.

Williams is a Christian.

Career statistics

NBA

Source

Regular season

|-
|style="text-align:left;"|
|style="text-align:left;"|New York
|41||23||12.3||.451||.000||.447||2.4||1.2||.5||.1||3.3
|-
|style="text-align:left;"|
|style="text-align:left;"|New York
|14||0||4.4||.318||–||.625||1.2||.3||.1||.0||1.4
|-
|style="text-align:left;"|
|style="text-align:left;"|San Antonio
|17||0||7.2||.435||.000||.750||1.4||.2||.2||.1||2.9
|-
|style="text-align:left;"|
|style="text-align:left;"|San Antonio
|65||26||20.7||.509||.000||.645||3.2||1.4||.8||.8||9.0
|-
|style="text-align:left;"|
|style="text-align:left;"|San Antonio
|72||16||18.3||.448||.500||.670||2.5||1.2||.5||.3||6.3
|-
|style="text-align:left;"|
|style="text-align:left;"|Denver
|1||0||6.0||.000||–||.500||.0||.0||.0||.0||1.0
|-
|style="text-align:left;"|
|style="text-align:left;"|Orlando
|75||23||20.0||.489||.400||.741||3.3||1.4||.6||.2||8.7
|-
|style="text-align:left;"|
|style="text-align:left;"|Orlando
|82||0||14.8||.447||.077||.639||3.0||1.0||.4||.2||5.0
|-
|style="text-align:left;"|
|style="text-align:left;"|Orlando
|68||19||18.9||.547||.000||.657||3.5||1.4||.7||.3||7.1
|-
|style="text-align:left;"|
|style="text-align:left;"|Philadelphia
|21||2||13.1||.425||.000||.750||2.1||1.2||.6||.2||4.4
|- class="sortbottom"
|style="text-align:center;" colspan=2|Career
|456||109||16.7||.481||.111||.665||2.8||1.2||.6||.3||6.3
|}

Playoffs

|-
|style="text-align:left;"|1995
|style="text-align:left;"|New York
|1||0||4.0||1.000||–||–||.0||.0||.0||.0||4.0
|-
|style="text-align:left;"|1996
|style="text-align:left;"|San Antonio
|7||0||4.1||.222||–||.500||1.0||.0||.0||.0||1.0
|-
|style="text-align:left;"|1998
|style="text-align:left;"|San Antonio
|5||0||5.6||.625||–||.667||1.2||.2||.0||.0||2.4
|-
|style="text-align:left;"|2001
|style="text-align:left;"|Orlando
|3||0||4.7||.750||–||.333||2.0||.0||.0||.7||2.3
|-
|style="text-align:left;"|2002
|style="text-align:left;"|Orlando
|4||3||23.3||.519||.000||.600||5.5||2.3||.8||.0||8.5
|-
|style="text-align:left;"|2003
|style="text-align:left;"|Philadelphia
|10||0||9.6||.348||.000||.750||1.5||.0||.2||.0||1.9
|- class="sortbottom"
|style="text-align:center;" colspan=2|Career
|30||3||8.8||.466||.000||.577||1.9||.3||.2||.1||2.8
|}

Head coaching record

|-
| style="text-align:left;"|New Orleans
| style="text-align:left;"|
| 82||46||36|||| style="text-align:center;"|3rd in Southwest||6||2||4||
| style="text-align:center;"|Lost in First Round
|-
| style="text-align:left;"|New Orleans
| style="text-align:left;"|
| 66||21||45|||| style="text-align:center;"|5th in Southwest||—||—||—||—
| style="text-align:center;"|Missed playoffs
|-
| style="text-align:left;"|New Orleans
| style="text-align:left;"|
| 82||27||55|||| style="text-align:center;"|5th in Southwest||—||—||—||—
| style="text-align:center;"|Missed playoffs
|-
| style="text-align:left;"|New Orleans
| style="text-align:left;"|
| 82||34||48|||| style="text-align:center;"|5th in Southwest||—||—||—||—
| style="text-align:center;"|Missed playoffs
|-
| style="text-align:left;"|New Orleans
| style="text-align:left;"|
| 82||45||37|||| style="text-align:center;"|5th in Southwest||4||0||4||
| style="text-align:center;"|Lost in First Round
|-
| style="text-align:left;"|Phoenix
| style="text-align:left;"|
| 73||34||39|||| style="text-align:center;"|3rd in Pacific||—||—||—||—
| style="text-align:center;"|Missed playoffs
|-
| style="text-align:left;"|Phoenix
| style="text-align:left;"|
| 72||51||21|||| style="text-align:center;"|1st in Pacific||22||14||8||
| style="text-align:center;"|Lost in NBA Finals
|-
| style="text-align:left;"|Phoenix
| style="text-align:left;"|
| 82||64||18|||| style="text-align:center;"|1st in Pacific||13||7||6||
| style="text-align:center;"|Lost in Conference Semifinals
|- class="sortbottom"
| style="text-align:center;" colspan="2"|Career
| 610||322||299|||| ||45||23||22||||

References

External links

Monty Williams, Coaching With a Servant's Heart

1971 births
Living people
20th-century African-American sportspeople
21st-century African-American sportspeople
African-American basketball coaches
African-American basketball players
American men's basketball players
Basketball coaches from Maryland
Basketball coaches from Virginia
Basketball players from Maryland
Basketball players from Virginia
Denver Nuggets players
New Orleans Hornets head coaches
New Orleans Pelicans head coaches
New York Knicks draft picks
New York Knicks players
Notre Dame Fighting Irish men's basketball players
Oklahoma City Thunder assistant coaches
Orlando Magic players
Philadelphia 76ers assistant coaches
Philadelphia 76ers players
Phoenix Suns head coaches
Portland Trail Blazers assistant coaches
San Antonio Spurs executives
San Antonio Spurs players
Small forwards
Sportspeople from Fredericksburg, Virginia